The Queen Mary Hospital, located in Pok Fu Lam on Hong Kong Island of Hong Kong, is the public district general hospital and teaching hospital of the Faculty of Dentistry and Li Ka Shing Faculty of Medicine of the University of Hong Kong. It has 1,706 beds. It provides general medical and surgical services to the residents of Western and Southern districts and is a tertiary referral centre for the whole territory of Hong Kong and beyond.

History 
The hospital had its foundation stone laid on 10 May 1935 by the Governor of Hong Kong, William Peel, and was officially opened on 13 April 1937 by Andrew Caldecott, the then Governor of Hong Kong. The hospital was named for Mary of Teck, the widowed Queen consort of King George V of the United Kingdom. It then replaced the Government Civil Hospital as the main accident and emergency hospital for Hong Kong Island. The hospital was greatly expanded over the years, with two major expansion projects completed in 1955 and 1983, the 2nd being designed by London-based hospital architects, Llewelyn Davies.

Buildings 

The Main Block (Wing A to E) is listed as a Grade III historic building. The Nurses Quarters is listed as a Grade II historic building.

Facilities 
As of 31 March 2019, the hospital has 1,711 beds.

Services
Accident and emergency 
Trauma centre
Anaesthesiology
Clinical Oncology
Cardiothoracic Anaesthesiology
Cardiothoracic Surgery
Ear, Nose & Throat
Microbiology
Neurosurgery
Obstetrics & Gynaecology
Oral Maxillo-facial Surgery & Dental Surgery
Ophthalmology
Orthopaedics & Traumatology
Paediatrics & Adolescent Medicine
Paediatric Cardiology
Pathology & Clinical Biochemistry
Psychiatry
Radiology
Surgery
Clinical Psychology
Dietetics
Medical Social Work
Occupational Therapy
Pharmacy
Physiotherapy
Prosthetics and Orthotics
Podiatry
Speech Therapy

, Macau healthcare authorities send patients to Queen Mary Hospital in instances where the local Macau hospitals are not equipped to deal with their scenarios.

Treatments 
In anti-leukaemic treatment, it used oral arsenic trioxide.

References

External links

 
Transportation Means for QMH

Hospital buildings completed in 1937
Hospital buildings completed in 1955
Hospital buildings completed in 1983
Pok Fu Lam
Teaching hospitals in Hong Kong
Hospitals established in 1937
University of Hong Kong
1937 establishments in Hong Kong